Matías Ezequiel Abaldo Menyou (born 2 April 2004) is a Uruguayan professional footballer who plays as a midfielder or second striker for Defensor Sporting.

Career
Abaldo is a youth academy graduate of Defensor Sporting. He made his professional debut for the club on 4 December 2021 in a 1–0 loss against Cerro.

Abaldo is a Uruguayan youth international.

Career statistics

Honours
Defensor Sporting
 Copa Uruguay: 2022

References

External links
 

2004 births
Living people
Footballers from Montevideo
Association football midfielders
Uruguayan footballers
Uruguayan Primera División players
Uruguayan Segunda División players
Defensor Sporting players